Fraoch Eilean is a small island in Loch Lomond, Scotland. Its name means "heather island" in Scottish Gaelic.

It is near Luss on the mainland, and according to legend, was used as its prison, indeed on Charles Ross's 1792 Plan of Dunbartonshire, Loch Lomond and its Environs, Fraoch Eilean is marked as "Luss Prison".

It is covered in heather and brambles.

References
 http://www.loch-lomond.net/islands/fraoch.html

External links
 https://web.archive.org/web/20090710015304/http://lochlomond-islands.com/
article which mentions it

Islands of Loch Lomond